Yu Lizhong (born September 14, 1949) was the first Chancellor of New York University Shanghai, having held this position from 2012 to 2020. Yu was awarded the title of Chancellor Emeritus of NYU Shanghai upon his retirement. Yu Lizhong joined NYU Shanghai from East China Normal University (ECNU), where he served as president from 2006–2012. He also served as president of Shanghai Normal University prior to 2006.

Education 
Yu Lizhong received his undergraduate degree in Geography from East China Normal University (ECNU) and his Ph.D. in Geography from the University of Liverpool. He also holds honorary doctorates from École Normale Supérieure and the University of Liverpool.

Research and Leadership 
Yu’s research focuses on environmental processes, environmental change, and sustainable development. He has published over 150 refereed papers in major journals and is widely recognized as an influential scholar in the field, serving on the boards of multiple educational, environmental, and scientific organizations throughout China. A skilled researcher and dedicated teacher, Yu is also an experienced administrator, having served in several important administrative capacities throughout his career at ECNU. It was under his leadership and forward-thinking global vision that ECNU embarked upon an ambitious path of growth and internationalization, cementing ECNU’s reputation as an institution of higher education with global impact.

References 

1949 births
Alumni of the University of Liverpool
East China Normal University alumni
Living people
Educators from Shanghai
Academic staff of the East China Normal University
Academic staff of Shanghai Normal University